Ajit Kumar Singh (10 February 1962 – 1 August 2007) was an Indian politician who was a member of the 14th Lok Sabha. He represented the Bikramganj constituency of Bihar and was a member of the Janata Dal (United) (JD(U)) political party. He died in a car accident on 1 August 2007, aged 45.

References

External links
 Home Page on the Parliament of India's Website

1962 births
2007 deaths
People from Bihar
India MPs 2004–2009
Janata Dal (United) politicians
Lok Sabha members from Bihar
People from Bhojpur district, India
Accidental deaths in India